The Casa Grande Woman's Club Building, at 407 N. Sacaton Street in Casa Grande, Arizona, USA, is an historic women's club building which was listed on the National Register of Historic Places in 1979.

The Casa Grande Woman's Club
Originally organized as the "Current Events Club" in 1913, the name was quickly changed to The Casa Grande Woman's Club and they joined the General Federation of Women's Clubs. The same year the Club founded the town's first library, an institution which they ran until 1953.

In 1921 the women organized a free school lunch program. In 1962 they organized the Casa Grande Valley Historical Society. The Casa Grande Woman's Club disbanded in 2006.

Building
The Casa Grande Woman's Club Building was designed by Tucson architect Henry Jaastad and built by Michael Sullivan.  It is a cobblestone-faced building, built in 1924 in the Pueblo Revival style. The Club Building was constructed with stones donated by club members, obtained from the nearby desert.  In 1997 the Woman's Club sold the building to Casa Grande for $1.00. The building underwent a complete restoration which was completed in 2001, and won the Arizona Main Street award for Best Historic Rehabilitation in 2002, and the Governor's Honor Award in 2003. The wooden entrance sign was restored in restored 2014.

Gallery

References

External links
 

Women's club buildings in Arizona
Cobblestone architecture
National Register of Historic Places in Pinal County, Arizona
Buildings and structures completed in 1924
Women's clubs in the United States
Women's organizations based in the United States
Pueblo Revival architecture in Arizona
History of women in Arizona